Talgat Koibakov is a Kazakhstani Major General.  he serves as Commander-in-Chief of the Kazakh Ground Forces.

References 

Living people
Year of birth missing (living people)
Place of birth missing (living people)
Kazakhstani generals